Bye Bye Bluebird is a 1999 Danish-Faroese comedy-drama road movie directed by Katrin Ottarsdóttir and starring Hildigunn Eyðfinsdóttir and Sigri Mitra Gaïni. The satirical film relates the tale of two eccentric young women who, after years abroad, return to their native Faroe Islands, and embark on a strange road trip. The film received awards at several film festivals including Lübeck Nordic Film Festival, Rouen Nordic Film Festival and the International Film Festival Rotterdam.

Cast
Hildigunn Eyðfinsdóttir as Rannvá
Sigri Mitra Gaïni as Barba
Johan Dalsgaard as Rúni
Elin K. Mouritsen as Barba's mother
Peter Hesse Overgaard as Rannvá's stepfather
Nora Bærentsen as Rannvá's mother
Egi Dam as Rannvá's father
Lovisa Køtlum Petersen as Rannvá's daughter
Adelborg Linklett as Rannvá's grandmother
Sverri Egholm as Rannvá's grandfather
Birita Mohr as Waitress / Singer
Sjúrður Sólstein as Smukke
Høgni Johansen as Helmsman
Kári Øster as Hærget Mand
Anna Kristin Bæk as Blafferpige

References

External links
Bye Bye Blackbird at Det Danske Filminstitut (in Danish)
 

1999 films
1999 comedy-drama films
Danish comedy-drama films
Faroese films
Faroese-language films
1990s road movies
Films directed by Katrin Ottarsdóttir
Films scored by Hilmar Örn Hilmarsson